County routes in Madison County, New York, are signed with the Manual on Uniform Traffic Control Devices-standard yellow-on-blue pentagon route marker.

Routes 1–50

Routes 51 and up

See also

County routes in New York

References

External links
Empire State Roads – Madison County Roads